Chanda Rubin and Arantxa Sánchez Vicario were the defending champions but they competed with different partners that year, Rubin with Brenda Schultz-McCarthy and Sánchez Vicario with Larisa Savchenko.

Rubin and Schultz-McCarthy lost in the quarterfinals to Savchenko and Sánchez Vicario.

Savchenko and Sánchez Vicario lost in the semifinals to Nicole Arendt and Manon Bollegraf.

Lindsay Davenport and Jana Novotná won in the final 6–3, 6–0 against Arendt and Bollegraf.

Seeds
Champion seeds are indicated in bold text while text in italics indicates the round in which those seeds were eliminated. The top four seeded teams received byes into the second round.

Draw

Final

Top half

Bottom half

External links
 ITF tournament edition details 

Amelia Island Championships
1997 WTA Tour